USCGC Alder (WAGL-216) was a wooden-hull lighthouse tender in commission in the fleet of the United States Lighthouse Service as USLHT Alder from 1924 to 1939, and in the fleet of the United States Coast Guard as USCGC Alder from 1939 until 1948. During World War II, she was given the additional designation (WAGL-216).

History
She was launched in 1917 and acquired by the United States Lighthouse Service in March 1924 for work as a lighthouse tender in the waters surrounding the Territory of Alaska. In 1929, she exploded and sank but was soon after re-floated and rebuilt. On 1 July 1939, the U.S. Lighthouse Service was abolished and the United States Coast Guard took over its responsibilities and assets; and Adler became part of the Coast Guard fleet as USCGC Adler. She continued to operate out of Ketchikan, Territory of Alaska as her home-port. She was commissioned in December 1940 and attached to the newly created Alaska Sector of the 13th Naval District (headquartered at Puget Sound Naval Shipyard) where she was one of the few ships then in newly-appointed Captain R.C. Parker's small "Alaskan Navy" which consisted of the gunboat and flagship , the cutter , three converted patrol craft, and her sister lighthouse tenders,  and USCG Cedar. She was decommissioned on 11 December 1947. On 14 June 1948, she was sold, renamed Acme, and operated as a merchant vessel. In 1960, she was sold and renamed Lummi. On 15 November 1960, she foundered and sank off the coast of Baja California.

References

1917 ships
Ships of the United States Coast Guard
Ships of the United States Lighthouse Service
Lighthouse tenders of the United States
World War II auxiliary ships of the United States
Ships of the Aleutian Islands campaign